The artillery loop is a knot with a loop on the bight for non-critical purposes.  The artillery loop must have the loop loaded or it will slip and contract easily.  It is an inferior knot to the alpine butterfly knot, possibly dangerously so, in that it can be yanked out of shape and turn into a running knot or noose.

Budworth states that this knot is often described as being best suited to take a load on only one of the ends, but reliable information on which end is difficult to find.

Tying the knot

Usage
The name harness loop derives from the fact that the knot was used when assisting horses on difficult terrain. Similarly, the name artillery loop or artilleryman's hitch derives from the fact that it was used when hauling field artillery into position.

See also 
 Harness bend
 List of knots

Notes and references

External links
 Artillery Loop